Gerti Jusuf Bogdani (born 7 July 1980) is a former member of the Assembly of the Republic of Albania for the Democratic Party of Albania.

Background
Bogdani was born in Tirana and followed the "Harry Fultz" high school. After high school he  followed studies at the Polytechnic University of New York, where graduated with "highest honors", summa cum laude and was awarded the Outstanding Graduate Award, to return later to Albania, started his professional career in academia at the University of New York in Tirana.

He is the founder and leader of Albanian Students Abroad Network (AS@N). Chairman of Municipal Unit no. 10 in Tirana, by winning the electoral battle he became the youngest elected in years.

References

Living people
Democratic Party of Albania politicians
1980 births
Members of the Parliament of Albania
Politicians from Tirana
21st-century Albanian politicians